Badito is an unincorporated community along the Huerfano River in Huerfano County, Colorado, United States. It is located at the intersection of Colorado State Highway 69 and County Road 520.

History

The community, located at the crossing of the Huerfano River, marks a path used by the Ancestral Puebloans during the Basketmaker era.

A Spanish expedition led by General Juan de Ulibarrí is the first known recorded journey through Badito. He documented the journey through Cuchara Pass, west of the Spanish Peaks in 1706. Juan de Ulibarrí's command reached the Rio de San Juan Baptista (currently named the Huerfano River) at Badito.

In 1819, Jacob Fowler noted an abandoned Spanish adobe fort at the location.

Later, the Taos Trappers Trail, joining the Santa Fe Trail with the Cherokee Trail, passed through this location. In 1867, as part of the Territory of Colorado, Badito became the Huerfano County seat. Later the county seat was moved to Walsenburg.

See also

References

Further reading
 Whiteley, Lee. (1999). The Cherokee Trail: Bent's Old Fort to Fort Bridger. Boulder, Colorado: Johnson Printing. 
 Historic Marker #13. Posted by the Territorial Daughters of Colorado, Badito, Colorado.
 Juan de Ulibarrí. Juan de Ulibarrí's Diary. Translated and posted by the Territorial Daughters of Colorado.

External links

Geography of Huerfano County, Colorado
Pre-statehood history of Colorado
Unincorporated communities in Huerfano County, Colorado
Unincorporated communities in Colorado
Former county seats in Colorado